The 2002 EA Sports 500 was a NASCAR Winston Cup Series stock car race held on October 6, 2002, at the Talladega Superspeedway in Talladega, Alabama.

Summary
The race was the 30th in the 2002 Winston Cup season, and was broadcast by NBC. Jimmie Johnson of Hendrick Motorsports was awarded the pole position after qualifying was canceled, while Dale Earnhardt Jr. of Dale Earnhardt, Inc., who won the previous race, led the most laps and won his second consecutive EA Sports 500. The race was also the first Winston Cup race at Talladega after the track had installed SAFER barriers. Vocal group Little Big Town performed the national anthem, while former National Football League quarterback Ken Stabler was the grand marshal.

The race also featured a record $250,000 leader bonus if the winner of the race becomes the Cup points leader, with Johnson, Mark Martin, Tony Stewart, Jeff Gordon and Rusty Wallace being the eligible drivers.

Race
On the warm-up lap, Mark Martin's steering box locked, causing him to crash into pole-sitter Jimmie Johnson. As a result of the incident, Martin was black-flagged, while Johnson's crew chief Chad Knaus requested NASCAR to inspect the car and repair the damaged right front fender. Johnson made a pit stop on lap one. Jeff Gordon led the first three laps, but on lap 125, he was forced to move the car to the garage after his crew found smoke under the hood, ending his race. Gordon was not the only Hendrick Motorsports to fail to finish; the other Hendrick drivers, Johnson, Terry Labonte and Joe Nemechek, also failed to finish due to engine problems.

In the end, Dale Earnhardt Jr. won his third consecutive Talladega race after leading the last 39 laps, making him the first driver to win both Talladega races (EA Sports 500 and the Aaron's 499) since his father accomplished the feat in 1999. Though Talladega has been known for featuring crashes known as "The Big One", no cautions occurred during the race.  It would be the last incident-free race in NASCAR's premiership until the 2012 Auto Club 400, which raced 125 laps of 200 before the caution took place for rain that ended the race on Lap 129, and the 2019 Pennzoil 400, which only was stopped twice for end-of-segment breaks.

Results
<small>Source:</small>

 Dale Earnhardt Jr.
 Tony Stewart
 Ricky Rudd
 Kurt Busch
 Jeff Green
 Steve Park
 Ryan Newman
 Michael Waltrip
 Dale Jarrett
 Ward Burton
 Jeff Burton
 Robby Gordon
 Rusty Wallace
 Matt Kenseth
 Ricky Craven
 Kyle Petty
 Scott Wimmer
 John Andretti
 Bill Elliott
 Jeremy Mayfield
 Jimmy Spencer
 Stacy Compton
 Todd Bodine
 Jerry Nadeau
 Bobby Labonte
 Jamie McMurray
 Kevin Harvick
 Mike Skinner
 Brett Bodine
 Mark Martin
 Dave Blaney
 Ron Hornaday Jr.
 Kenny Wallace
 Casey Atwood
 Mike Wallace
 Elliott Sadler
 Jimmie Johnson*
 Terry Labonte*
 Joe Nemechek*
 Johnny Benson Jr.*
 Ken Schrader*
 Jeff Gordon*
 Jay Sauter** Driver failed to finish race''

Standings after the race

References

EA Sports 500
EA Sports 500
NASCAR races at Talladega Superspeedway